Mitchell and Webb are a British comedy double act, composed of David Mitchell and Robert Webb. They are best known for starring in the Channel 4 sitcom Peep Show and their radio and TV sketch shows That Mitchell and Webb Sound and That Mitchell and Webb Look. The duo first met at the Footlights in 1993 and collaborated on the 1995 revue while at Cambridge.

Works

Television and radio
After graduating from university, the duo performed in two-man shows at the Edinburgh Fringe Festival and some sketch writing, including a series of Big Train and also for Armstrong and Miller's eponymous show. Their big break came in 2000 when they joined the writing team for the BBC Two sketch show Bruiser. The following year, the short-lived Play UK channel invited them to write their own sketch show, The Mitchell and Webb Situation. Later, they wrote and starred in the Radio 4 sketch show That Mitchell and Webb Sound, later adapted for television on BBC Two as That Mitchell and Webb Look. The first series of That Mitchell and Webb Look won the BAFTA for Best Comedy Programme in 2007.

They often appear with actors Olivia Colman, James Bachman, Mark Evans and Paterson Joseph.

In 2008, the duo wrote a pilot script for their first original TV sitcom, Playing Shop. The two star as Eric and Jamie, friends who set up a business together after they are made redundant from their old jobs. Hartswood Films recorded the pilot episode on 20 December, with a view to producing a full series for BBC Two. Although approved by BBC, plans for future episodes fell through as Mitchell and Webb decided not to proceed with it. 

Mitchell and Webb collaborated with Armstrong and Miller again for the 2009 Red Nose Day fundraising event. They co-wrote and starred in two short sketches incorporating Armstrong and Miller's World War II airmen characters from The Armstrong and Miller Show and their characters Sir Digby and Ginger from their radio show That Mitchell and Webb Sound.

In 2012, the pair provided the voices for the pair of robots in the Doctor Who TV episode "Dinosaurs on a Spaceship" in addition to starring in the BBC Two comedy-drama Ambassadors.

In 2017, they appeared in the Channel 4 sitcom 
Back, on which they also worked as executive producers.

In 2022, they appeared in the Adult Swim series "Rick and Morty" as "Knights of the Sun" in the episode titled "A Rick in King Mortur's Mort" alongside Jack Black, Matt King (comedian) and Daniel Radcliffe

Other
Mitchell and Webb have also appeared in the U.K. regional versions of the 'Get a Mac' advertisements for Apple.

They also voiced a pair of peas on the Ant and Dec's Saturday Night Takeaway sponsorship TV adverts for Bird's Eye.

Magicians, a film starring the pair, was released on 18 May 2007.

They have also published the comedy book This Mitchell and Webb Book.

References 

English comedy duos
Apple Inc. advertising
English male comedians
British comedy duos